Temnora eranga is a moth of the family Sphingidae. It is known from forests from Sierra Leone to Congo and Uganda and western Kenya.

The length of the forewings is 16–18 mm. It is similar to Temnora scitula, but distinguishable by the more variegated pattern, the lack of a postmedian translucent spot and another translucent spot being cream rather than white.

References

Temnora
Moths described in 1889
Moths of Africa